lobby card

Exit the Vamp is a lost 1921 American silent comedy film directed by Frank Urson and written by Clara Beranger. The film stars Ethel Clayton, T. Roy Barnes, Fontaine La Rue, Theodore Roberts, William Boyd, and Michael D. Moore. The film was released on November 6, 1921, by Paramount Pictures.

Plot
As described in a film magazine, successful lawyer John Shipley (Barnes) becomes fascinated by a vampire (La Rue) of the accepted type. His wife Marion (Clayton) becomes aware of the infatuation and adopts the ways of her opponent, pretending incidentally an affection for a World War I veteran (Boyd) whom she knew in France. At a house party to which Marion had invited the other woman, her husband discovers his mistake in his judgment of womanly values and the wife emerges from the conflict victorious.

Cast
Ethel Clayton as Marion Shipley
T. Roy Barnes as John Shipley
Fontaine La Rue as Mrs. Willy Strong
Theodore Roberts as Old Man Shipley
William Boyd as Robert Pitts
Michael D. Moore as Junior Shipley
Mattie Peters as Mammy

References

External links

1921 films
1920s English-language films
Silent American comedy films
1921 comedy films
Paramount Pictures films
Lost American films
American black-and-white films
American silent feature films
Films directed by Frank Urson
1921 lost films
Lost comedy films
1920s American films